Hakea corymbosa, commonly known as the cauliflower hakea is a plant of the family Proteaceae which is endemic to the south-west of Western Australia. An attractive extremely prickly bush with sweetly scented yellowish flowers. The nectar rich blooms and dense form provides a good habitat for wildlife.

Description
The young shoots are referred to as "water canes",  when mature they develop into a new cluster of foliage. The shrub becomes extremely dense and prickly, the foliage appearing like clusters of "clouds". Leaves are alternately arranged along the stems with a distinct centre vein on the upper side and three on the  underside ending in a sharp point. The inflorescence consists of 12-18 flowers appearing in profusion in leaf axils. The perianth is a pale yellow-green.

Taxonomy and namingHakea corymbosa was first formally described by the botanist Robert Brown in 1830 as part of the work Supplementum primum prodromi florae Novae Hollandiae. The type specimen had been collected at King George Sound by William Baxter in 1823. The specific epithet (corymbosa) is derived from the Latin corymbus meaning "bunch of flowers", "peak" or "top" referring to the flowers growing as a flat top or in a convex arrangement. A lignotuberous form with bright yellow flowers found north of Perth was classified as a separate species, Hakea eneabba.
Distribution and habitatHakea corymbosa  is native to the Great Southern, southern Wheatbelt and Goldfields-Esperance regions of Western Australia from Williams in the west, Albany in the south to Kondinin in the north and Cape Arid in the east. It is found in acid to slightly alkaline, sandy soils over or around laterite or granite, in heath or woodland.

Use in horticultureHakea corymbosa can be grown in a sunny location in most soil types, preferring temperate climates receiving over  rainfall a year. Plants in a shady spot tend to have elongated growth.  It can be grown as a windbreak, hedge or for erosion control. Hakea corymbosa'' is recommended for attracting birds as it provides a dense safe haven with its prickly habit and  nectar rich flowers as a food source.  Propagation is by seed, preferably gathered using gloves due to the prickliness of the foliage.

References

External links

corymbosa
Eudicots of Western Australia
Plants described in 1830
Taxa named by Robert Brown (botanist, born 1773)